The 24th Special Operations Wing (Air Force Special Tactics) is a United States Air Force active-duty wing that was activated on 12 June 2012. Its headquarters is at Hurlburt Field, Florida and it has component groups located in North Carolina, Georgia and Washington. It is the third special operations wing in Air Force Special Operations Command (AFSOC).

The 24th SOW is a reactivation of the 24th Wing, previously assigned with the Twelfth Air Force, stationed at Howard Air Force Base, Panama. It was inactivated on 1 November 1999. The inactivation of the 24th Wing and the closure of Howard Air Force Base ended an 82-year United States Air Force presence in Panama, which began with the formation of the 7th Aero Squadron on 29 March 1917.

The 24th Special Operations Wing is the only Special Tactics Wing in the Air Force. Its primary mission is to conduct global air, space, and cyber-enabled special operations across the spectrum of conflict to prepare to fight. The 24 SOW is U.S. Special Operations Command's tactical air/ground integration force and the Air Force's special operations ground force that leads global access, precision strike, personnel recovery and battlefield surgery operations.

Core capabilities encompass airfield reconnaissance, assessment, and control; personnel recovery; joint terminal attack control; battlefield surgery; and environmental reconnaissance.

Organization
As of April 2020 the wing is organized as follows:

 24th Special Operations Wing, Hurlburt Field, FL
 Special Tactics Training Squadron, Hurlburt Field, FL
 720th Special Tactics Group, Hurlburt Field, FL
 21st Special Tactics Squadron, Pope Field, NC
 22nd Special Tactics Squadron, Joint Base Lewis-McChord, WA
 23rd Special Tactics Squadron, Hurlburt Field, FL
 26th Special Tactics Squadron, Cannon Air Force Base, NM
 720th Operations Support Squadron, Hurlburt Field, FL
 724th Special Tactics Group, Pope Field, NC
 17th Special Tactics Squadron, Ft. Benning GA
 24th Special Tactics Squadron, operationally assigned to Joint Special Operations Command, Pope Field, NC
 724th Operations Support Squadron, Pope Field, N.C.
 724th Intelligence Squadron, Pope Field, NC
 724th Special Tactics Support Squadron, Pope Field, N.C.
 123rd Special Tactics Squadron (Air National Guard), Standiford Field, KY
 125th Special Tactics Squadron (Air National Guard), Portland International Airport, OR

History

World War II
It was activated on 25 December 1942 to control all Army Air Forces units on Iceland and subsequently disestablished in June 1944.

Post war era
From August 1946 until replaced by the Antilles Air Division in July 1948 the wing supervised large numbers of major and minor bases and Air Force units in the Caribbean area from Puerto Rico to British Guiana.

Panama and special operations

It was organized once more in November 1967 in the Panama Canal Zone, replacing the 5700th Air Base Wing. The wing assumed operation and maintenance responsibilities for Howard and Albrook Air Force Bases and a special operations mission that included air transport, paramilitary operations, exercise participation, civic actions in Central and South America, search and rescue missions, humanitarian operations, mercy missions, aeromedical evacuation, and support of Army Special Forces, U.S. military assistance units, and training of Latin American air forces. From its activation in 1967 until mid-1972, the 24th Wing operated the USAF Tropic Survival School at Albrook. It also controlled various rotational detachments from 1967–1987. The wing lost UH–1 helicopters and control of search and rescue missions in the area after 1 March 1983. The wing inactivated on 31 January 1987, its subordinate components reassigned directly to the USAF Southern Air Division.

The 24th was reactivated on 1 January 1989, as the 24th Composite Wing assuming responsibilities for Howard AFB and Albrook AFS. The wing flew combat sorties in the Invasion of Panama, December 1989 – January 1990. The wing trained foreign and domestic pilots in forward air control. It again flew search and rescue, aeromedical airlift and disaster relief missions in the Latin American region from 1989–1990. Members of the wing deployed to Southwest Asia to provide air liaison support between ground forces and air operations from 1 October 1990 – February 1991. When the 24th Composite Wing inactivated in 1991, its assets were placed under Air Forces in Panama.

On 11 February 1992 the wing again reactivated as the 24th Wing and became the senior USAF organization in Panama and replaced the previous command and division-level Air Force host units. In June 1992, it began operating the only C–21, CT–43, C–27 and special mission C–130s in Air Combat Command. The wing provided control and support to multi-service units directed by United States Southern Command and United States Southern Air Force from 1992–1999. Missions included counter-narcotics operations, aerial command and control, intratheater airlift, security assistance and defense of the Panama Canal. The wing operated both Howard Air Force Base and Albrook Air Force Station.

On 1 April 1997 the 310th Airlift Squadron was reassigned to Air Mobility Command's 21st Air Force. The 24th Wing was inactivated on 1 November 1999 with the closure of Howard AFB and its turnover to the Panamanian government.

Special tactics
When the wing was reactivated in June 2012 it comprised the 720th Special Tactics Group and the Special Tactics Training Squadron based at Hurlburt Field, the 724th Special Tactics Group based at Pope Army Airfield. The Special Tactics Squadrons are made up of Special Tactics Officers, Combat Controllers, Combat Rescue Officers, Pararescuemen, Special Reconnaissance (formerly Special Operations Weather Technicians), Air Liaison Officers, Tactical Air Control Party operators, and a number of combat support airmen which comprise 58 Air Force specialties.

Special Tactics Airmen often embed with United States special forces including Navy SEALs, Army Green Berets and Rangers to provide various skills from combat air support to medical aid and personnel recovery.

Lineage
 Established as the 24th Composite Wing (Special) on 19 November 1942
 Activated on 25 December 1942
 Disestablished on 15 June 1944
 Reestablished as 24th Composite Wing on 5 August 1946
 Activated on 25 August 1946
 Inactivated on 28 July 1948
 Activated on 30 October 1967 (not organized)
 Organized on 8 November 1967
 Redesignated 24th Air Commando Wing on 15 March 1968
 Redesignated 24th Special Operations Wing on 15 July 1968
 Redesignated 24th Special Operations Group on 30 June 1972
 Redesignated 24th Composite Group on 15 November 1973
 Redesignated 24th Composite Wing on 1 January 1976
 Inactivated on 31 January 1987
 Activated on 1 January 1989
 Inactivated on 15 February 1991
 Redesignated 24th Wing on 1 February 1992
 Activated on 11 February 1992
 Inactivated on 1 November 1999
 Redesignated 24th Special Operations Wing
 Activated on 12 June 2012

Assignments
 Iceland Base Command, US Army Forces, Iceland, 25 December 1942 – 15 June 1944
 Sixth Air Force, 25 August 1946 – 28 July 1948
 United States Air Forces Southern Command, 30 October 1967
 United States Air Force Southern Air Division, 1 January 1976 – 31 January 1987
 830th Air Division, 1 January 1989 – 15 February 1991
 Twelfth Air Force, 11 February 1992 – 1 November 1999
 Air Force Special Operations Command, 12 June 2012 – present

Components
Groups
 24th Operations Group: 11 February 1992 – 1 November 1999
 130th Special Operations Group: attached 30 January 1971  – 27 February 1971, 5–14 February 1973
 134th Anti-Aircraft Artillery Group: attached 1 November 1943 – 15 June 1944
 143d Air Commando Group: attached 8 February – 9 March 1969
 342d Composite Group: 25 December 1942 – 18 March 1944
 720th Special Tactics Group: 12 June 2012 – present
 724th Special Tactics Group: 12 June 2012 – present

Squadrons
 33d Fighter Squadron: 18 March 1944 – 15 June 1944
 91st Reconnaissance Squadron: 12 January 1948 – 26 July 1948
 330th Transport Squadron: 25 August 1946 – 15 October 1946
 24th Air Transport: 15 March 1968 – 30 June 1971
 605th Air Commando Squadron (later 605th Special Operations Squadron): 8 November 1967 – 30 April 1972
 24th Special Operations Squadron (later 24th Composite Squadron; 24th Tactical Air Support Squadron): 18 March 1969 – 1 July 1975; 1 January 1976 – 31 January 1987; 1 January 1989 – 15 February 1991
 Special Tactics Training Squadron: 12 June 2012 – present

Detachments
 Det A, Fighter Command (IBC, US Army Forces, Iceland): attached 12 Feb – 15 June 1944
 Det, 314 Troop Carrier Group: attached 1 October 1946 – 26 July 1948
 TAC A-7 Rotational Element (various detachments): attached 13 November 1972 – 30 September 1978
 ANG A-7 Rotational Element (various detachments): attached 1 October 1978 – 31 January 1987
 ANG A-10 Rotational Element (various detachments): attached Feb–Apr 1985
 TAC C-130 Rotational Element (various detachments): attached 8 November 1967 – 30 November 1974
 MAC C-130 Rotational Element (various detachments): attached 1 December 1974 – 30 September 1977
 AFRES and ANG C-130 Rotational Element (various detachments): attached 1 Oct 1977 – c. 1 December 1984

Stations
 Camp Olympia, Reykjavík, Iceland, 25 December 1942
 Camp Tripoli, Reykjavik, Iceland, 13 March – 15 June 1944
 Borinquen Field (later Borinquen Army Air Field, Borinquen Field, Ramey Air Force Base), Puerto Rico, 25 August 1946 – 28 July 1948
 Albrook Air Force Base, Panama Canal Zone, 8 November 1967
 Howard Air Force Base, Panama Canal Zone, 3 January 1968 – 31 January 1987
 Howard Air Force Base, Panama Canal Zone (later Panama), 1 January 1989 – 15 February 1991
 Howard Air Force Base, Panama, 11 February 1992 – 1 November 1999
 Hurlburt Field, Florida, 12 June 2012 – present

Aircraft
The 24th Special Operations Wing currently does not have any aircraft; it is composed of ground operators. 
Lockheed P-38 Lightning (1942–1944)
Bell P-39 Airacobra (1942–1943)
Curtiss P-40 Warhawk (1943–1944)
Republic P-47 Thunderbolt (1944)
Boeing B-17 Flying Fortress (1946–1948)
Douglas C-47 Skytrain (1946–1948, 1967–1970)
Douglas C-54 Skymaster (1947–1948, 1967–1972)
Beechcraft F-2 Expeditor (1948)
Douglas A-26 Invader (1967–1968)
Curtiss C-46 Commando (1967–1968)
Douglas C-118 Liftmaster (1967–1971)
Lockheed C-130 Hercules (1967–1984, 1992–1999)
Convair C-131 Samaritan (1967–1968)
Sikorsky CH-3 (1967–1970)
Sikorsky H-19 (1967–1969)
North American T-28 Trojan (1967–1970)
 Convair VT-29 (1967–1970)
Helio U-10 Courier (1967–1971)
Bell UH-1 Iroquois (1967–1983)
Cessna A-37 Dragonfly (1967–1972)
Grumman HU-16 Albatross (1969)
Fairchild C-123 Provider (1970–1975)
Fairchild C-119 Flying Boxcar (1971, 1973)
Cessna O-2 Skymaster (1971–1986)
LTV A-7 Corsair II (1972–1987)
Fairchild Republic A-10 Thunderbolt II (1985)
 Cessna OA-37 Dragonfly (1985–1991)
 Learjet C-21 (1992–1999)
Boeing T-43 (1992–1999)
Alenia C-27 Spartan (1992–1999)

Notes

References

Bibliography

 
 
 

Military units and formations in Florida
024
1942 establishments in Iceland